Jerreth Sterns (born July 1, 1999) is an American football wide receiver who is a free agent. He played college football at Houston Baptist before transferring to Western Kentucky.

High school career 
Sterns went to Waxahachie High School. As a senior, Sterns caught 8 touchdown passes for 956 yards. He was rated as a 2-star recruit and the 374th best player in the state of Texas according to 247 Sports. Sterns was originally committed to Army but he decommitted and flipped to Houston Baptist.

College career

Houston Baptist 
Sterns played in 11 games as a freshman. He recorded 4 receiving touchdowns and one rushing touchdown. His first career touchdown came against SMU.

As a sophomore in 2019 Sterns, would tally ten total touchdowns on 867 receiving yards in 12 games. In a game vs Lamar, he would have three touchdown receptions.

In 2020, during a shortened four game season, Sterns would have five touchdowns and 454 yards. In 27 games with Houston Baptist, Sterns would record 18 touchdowns on 220 receptions for 1,971 yards. On December 14, 2020 Sterns along with HBU quarterback Bailey Zappe announced their decision to transfer after the 2020 season.

Western Kentucky 
On December 18, 2020, Sterns announced he would be transferring to Western Kentucky following former Houston Baptist OC Zach Kittley and quarterback Bailey Zappe. Sterns played in all of Western Kentucky's 14 games posting career highs of 17 touchdowns and 1,902 receiving yards on 150 catches. Sterns was the NCAA's leader in receiving yards, receptions and was tied for most receiving touchdowns. Behind Sterns and Zappe, the Hilltoppers won the Boca Raton Bowl and earned a spot in the C-USA Championship Game. On December 19, 2021, Sterns announced he would be declaring for the 2022 NFL Draft.

Professional career

Tampa Bay Buccaneers
Sterns signed with the Tampa Bay Buccaneers as an undrafted free agent on May 13, 2022. He was waived on August 30, 2022.

Los Angeles Rams
On December 22, 2022, Sterns signed with the practice squad of the Los Angeles Rams. He signed a reserve/futures contract on January 9, 2023.

On March 10, 2023, Sterns was waived by the Los Angeles Rams.

Personal 
Sterns has six siblings, including Denver Broncos safety Caden Sterns. His father played basketball for Baylor. Sterns is a Christian.

References

External links 
 Los Angeles Rams bio
 Houston Baptist Huskies bio
 Western Kentucky Hilltoppers Bio

1999 births
Living people
American football wide receivers
Houston Christian Huskies football players
Western Kentucky Hilltoppers football players
Waxahachie High School alumni
Tampa Bay Buccaneers players
Los Angeles Rams players